War Party (released in the Philippines as Toy Soldiers Too) is a 1988 film directed by Franc Roddam and starring Billy Wirth and Kevin Dillon. Set in present-day Montana, it explores the tension and mistrust that can characterize interactions between Native Americans and White Americans.

Plot
A group of re-enactors attempt to stage a 100th-anniversary battle between US Cavalry and Blackfeet Indians. Racial hostilities and a real gun lead to some all too real casualties, and three young Blackfeet men are caught in the middle. The film follows their flight for freedom in the face of an angry community which has mistakenly blamed them for the violence.

Cast
Billy Wirth as Sonny Crowkiller
Kevin Dillon as Skitty Harris
Tim Sampson as Warren Cutfoot
Jimmie Ray Weeks as Jay Stivic
Kevyn Major Howard as Calvin Morrisey
Jerry Hardin as The Sheriff
Tantoo Cardinal as Sonny's Mother
Bill McKinney as The Mayor
Guy Boyd as Major Crawford, National Guard
R.D. Call as Posse Member #1
William Frankfather as The Governor
M. Emmet Walsh as Colin Ditweiler
Dennis Banks as Ben Crowkiller / Dead Crow Wolf
Saginaw Grant as Freddie Man Wolf
Rodney A. Grant as The Crow

Production
Filming largely took place on the Blackfeet Indian Reservation in Montana. A few scenes were filmed in Glacier National Park, in the town of Cut Bank, Montana and in the town of Choteau, MT.

Release
The film was released in the United States on September 15, 1988. In the Philippines, the film was released as Toy Soldiers Too on July 3, 1992, connecting the film to the unrelated 1991 film Toy Soldiers.

References

External links

1988 films
1988 drama films
Blackfoot in popular culture
Films about Native Americans
Films set in Montana
Films shot in Montana
Films directed by Franc Roddam
1980s English-language films